Jason Scott Sadofsky (born September 13, 1970), more commonly known as Jason Scott, is an American archivist, historian of technology, filmmaker, performer, and actor. Scott has been known by the online pseudonyms Sketch, SketchCow, The Slipped Disk, and textfiles. He has been called "the figurehead of the digital archiving world".

He is the creator, owner and maintainer of textfiles.com, a web site which archives files from historic bulletin board systems. He is the creator of a 2005 documentary film about BBSes,
BBS: The Documentary, and a 2010 documentary film about interactive fiction, GET LAMP.

Scott lives in Hopewell Junction, New York. He was the co-owner of the late Twitter celebrity cat Sockington. He works for the Internet Archive and has given numerous presentations at technology related conferences on the topics of digital history, software, and website preservation.

Early life 
Jason Scott Sadofsky graduated from Horace Greeley High School in Chappaqua, New York, and served on the staff of the school newspaper under the title "Humor Staff". While in high school he produced the humor magazine Esnesnon ("nonsense" backwards). He later graduated from Emerson College in 1992 with a film degree. While at Emerson, he worked for the school humor magazine, school newspaper, WERS 88.9 FM radio, and served as art director on several dramatic plays.

Career 
After graduating from Emerson, Scott lived in Harvard Square in Cambridge, Massachusetts, where he was employed as a temp worker while also drawing caricatures for pay on the streets of Cambridge.

In 1990, Scott co-created TinyTIM, a popular MUSH that he ran for ten years. In 1995, Jason joined the video game company Psygnosis as a technical support worker, before being hired by a video game startup, Focus Studios, as an art director. After Focus Studios' closure, Jason moved into UNIX administration, where he remained until 2009.

He has been a speaker at DEF CON, an annual hacker conference, the first time at the 7th conference in 1999, and has spoken there almost every year since then. Scott also spoke at PhreakNIC 6 and 9, Rubi Cons 4 and 5, the 5th H.O.P.E. conference in 2004, Notacons 1, 2 (as a backup), 3 and 4, Toorcon 7, and beta premiered his documentary at the 7th annual Vintage Computer Festival. Most of his talks focus on the capturing of digital history or consist of narratives of stories relevant to his experiences online.

In 2006, Scott announced that he was starting a documentary on video arcades, titled ARCADE. Although he did not complete the project, all of the footage he shot for ARCADE has been made available on the Internet Archive.

In 2007, he co-founded Blockparty, a North American demoparty. For their inaugural year, they paired up with Notacon which takes place annually in Cleveland, Ohio. This collaborative effort allowed the fledgling party to utilize the existing support structure of an established conference.

In January 2009, he formed "Archive Team," a group dedicated to preserving the historical record of websites that close down. Responding to the announcement by AOL of the closure of AOL Hometown, the team announced plans to save Podango and GeoCities.

In October 2009, he started raising funds for a year-long sabbatical from his job as a computer systems administrator, to pursue technology history and archival projects full-time. By November 2009, he had reached his funding goals, with the support of over 300 patrons.

In early 2011, he was involved in Yahoo! Video and Google Video archive projects.

Scott announced the creation of Archive Corps, a volunteer effort to preserve physical archives, in 2015.

Scott has been hosting his own podcast called Jason Scott Talks His Way Out of It since 2017.

Scott is the software curator at the Internet Archive. In April 2019, he uploaded all of the source code for Infocom's text-based adventure games and interactive fiction, including Zork and The Hitchhiker's Guide to the Galaxy, to GitHub.

Sockington

Sockington was a domestic cat who lived in Waltham, Massachusetts. He gained large-scale fame via the social networking site Twitter. Scott regularly posted from Sockington's Twitter account from late 2007. , Sockington's account has over 1.4 million followers, many of which are pet accounts themselves. Sockington died on July 18, 2022.

Acting 
Scott is a frequent collaborator of Johannes Grenzfurthner and appeared as an actor in Soviet Unterzoegersdorf: Sector 2 (2009), Glossary of Broken Dreams (2018), and the science fiction comedy Je Suis Auto (2019).

Personal life 

Divorced, Scott was engaged as of 2017.

Filmography 
 BBS: The Documentary (2005) (director)
 GET LAMP (2010) (director)
 Going Cardboard (2012) (editor)
 DEFCON: The Documentary (2013) (director)
 Traceroute (2016) (interviewee)
 Glossary of Broken Dreams (2018) (actor)
 Class Action Park (2020) (interviewee)
 Je Suis Auto (2023, upcoming) (actor)

Presentations 

 TEXTFILES, G-PHILES, AND LOG FILES: Remembering the 1980s Through ASCII – DEF CON 7, July 10, 1999
 TEXTFILES.COM: One Year Later – DEF CON 8, July 29, 2000
 So You Got Your Lame Ass Sued: A Legal Narrative – DEF CON 9, July 2001
 Documenting the BBS – Rubi-Con 4, April 2002
 History of Phreaking 101 – PhreakNIC 6.0, November 1, 2002
 Keynote: The Future is Now – Rubi-Con 5, March 28, 2003
 Apple II Pirate Lore – Rubi-Con 5, March 29, 2003
 100 Years of the Computer Art Scene (with RaD Man) – Notacon 1, April 2004
 Saving Digital History: A Quick and Dirty Guide – H2K4, July 11, 2004
 BBS: The Documentary: A Preview – DEF CON 12, August 2004
 The History of the Coleco Adam (mp3) – Notacon 2, April 2005
 Why Tech Documentaries are Impossible (And why we have to do them anyway.) – DEF CON 13, July 31, 2005
 Fidonet Presentation and Q&A – ToorCon 7, September 17, 2005
 BBS Documentary Presentation – PhreakNIC 9.0, October 22, 2005
 ConCon: A History of Hacker Conferences – Shmoocon 2, January 13, 2005
 Your Moment of Audio Zen: A History of Podcasts – Notacon 3, April 7, 2006
 The Great Failure of Wikipedia – Notacon 3, April 8, 2006
 Retrocomputing (with Sam Nitzberg, Cheshire Catalyst, Sellam Ismail) – H.O.P.E. Number Six, July 2006
 Underground Documentaries: The Art of the Interview and the Access (with Julien McArdle) – H.O.P.E. Number Six, July 2006
 Wheel of Internet Knowledge – Phreaknic X, October 2006
 Mythapedia – STM (Scientific, Technical & Medical Publishers) Innovations Seminar, December 1, 2006
 Wikipedia, Brick by Brick – Notacon 4, April 27, 2007
 The Edge of Forever – Making Computer History – DEF CON 15, August 4, 2007
 Making a Text Adventure Documentary – DEF CON 16, August 10, 2008
 Keynote speech – KansasFest, July 22, 2009
 That Awesome Time I Was Sued for Two Billion Dollars – DEF CON 17, July 30, 2009
 Atomic Porn: What is the smallest particle of erotica? – Arse Elektronika 2009, October 2, 2009
 DistriWiki: A Proposal – May 11, 2010
 You're Stealing It Wrong! 30 Years of Inter-Pirate Battles - DEF CON 18, July 31, 2010
 Archive Team: A Distributed Preservation of Service Attack - DEF CON 19, August 6, 2011
 DEF CON Documentary Trailer - DEF CON 20, July 27, 2012
 Wanted: Dead or Alive – Webstock, February 15, 2013
 Making Of The DEF CON Documentary - DEF CON 21, August 2, 2013
 From COLO to YOLO: Confessions Of The Angriest Archivist — Bacon, May 16, 2014
 Thwarting the Peasants: A Guided and Rambunctious Tour Through the 2600 DeCSS Legal Files – HOPE X, July 19, 2014
 So You Want To Murder a Software Patent – Derbycon, September 26, 2014

Citations

General references 

 Jason Scott, The Defendant (July 2001). So You Got Your Lame Ass Sued: A Legal Narrative. DEF CON speaker. Retrieved 2004-11-19.
 Jason Sadofsky, The Tribune Articles, 1987–88
 Jason Scott, The Life and Times of Jason Scott
 DEF CON 13 (2005) speakers, including Jason Scott's "Why Tech Documentaries Are Impossible"

External links 

 Jason Scott – Personal homepage (Archived)
 
 
 Collector's Trove of Podcasts, an interview with Jason Scott in Wired magazine online
 The Whole Lawsuit Thing – HarvardNetSucks account of the lawsuit.
 https://web.archive.org/web/20170911133405/http://sadofsky.com/
 leahpeah interview with Jason Scott
 fsck interview with Jason Scott
 
 Jason Scott talking about acting

 
1970 births
American bloggers
American documentary filmmakers
American people of Jewish descent
American people of Russian descent
Creative Commons-licensed authors
Cultural historians
Emerson College alumni
Hacker culture
Historians of technology
Horace Greeley High School alumni
Living people
MUD developers
People from Chappaqua, New York
People from Hopewell Junction, New York
Writers from Cambridge, Massachusetts
Internet Archive collectors